Uganda Airlines was the flag carrier of Uganda. It was headquartered in Entebbe, Wakiso District, Uganda, and operated from its hub in Entebbe International Airport.

The airline was later revived and began flying again in 2019 under the same name, Uganda Airlines.

History

It commenced operations in 1977, when Uganda Aviation Services (UAS), set up by British United Airways in 1965 but then a UDC subsidiary, was absorbed by Uganda Airlines, taking over the UAS route network. Following delivery of the first Boeing 707-320C in the late 1970s, new routes to Brussels, London and Rome were inaugurated. A second Boeing 707-320C entered the fleet in 1981. That year, new routes to Cairo, Cologne and Dubai were launched, followed by Dar es Salaam, Kilimanjaro and Nairobi in subsequent years.

By  the fleet included one Boeing 707-320C, two Fokker F27-600s, one Lockheed L-100-30, one Twin Otter and one B-N Trislander. A Boeing 737 was leased from Air Zimbabwe in 1994 to serve Bujumbura and Kigali, as well as destinations in South Africa. Tel Aviv was added to the route network in 1995, and by 1998 all European routes were discontinued.

Upon the creation of Alliance Air in late 1994—later known as SA Alliance—an entity jointly owned by the Tanzanian and Ugandan governments, Air Tanzania and Uganda Airlines, as well as by South African Airways (SAA), Tanzania and Uganda granted the rights of long-haul operations to the new airline. The agreement intended to feed Alliance Air's operations with both Air Tanzania and Uganda Airlines domestic and regional services. However, both regional carriers grew less than expected, and the deficit Uganda Airlines accumulated led the Ugandan Government to make a decision on whether to liquidate the airline or privatise it.

Privatisation attempt and collapse
In the late 1990s, the airline was in a delicate cash position owing to mismanagement, when the Government of Uganda planned to privatise the debt-ridden airline, seeking for an investor to keep the company afloat. Initially, several firms held an interest in taking over Uganda Airlines. SA Alliance/SAA, Air Mauritius, British Airways, Johannesburg-based Inter Air, Kenya Airways, and Sabena, all seemed to be interested bidders at the beginning, but eventually declined to submit bids, except for SAA that remained the only bidder by early 1999. SAA would have had a 49% participation in the company; nevertheless, it later dropped its bid after encountering strong legislature opposition.

Destinations

From its hub in Entebbe International Airport, in its heyday the company used to operate scheduled services to destinations within Africa, Europe and Middle East. Following is a list of destinations Uganda Airlines served all through its history:

Codeshare agreements
Following is a list of companies Uganda Airlines had codeshare agreements with at the time of closure; routes were actually operated by Uganda Airlines:
Air Tanzania, Dar-es-Salaam and Johannesburg to/from Entebbe
Emirates, Dubai to/from Entebbe
Kenya Airways, Nairobi to/from Entebbe

Fleet

Historically, the company operated the following aircraft:

Britten-Norman Trislander
Twin Otter
Boeing 707-320C
Boeing 727
Boeing 737-200
Boeing 737-500
Cessna 402B
Cessna U206
Cherokee 235
Cherokee Six
Fokker F-27-600
King Air 100
Lockheed L-100-30

Accidents and incidents
According to Aviation Safety Network, the airline experienced three accidents/incidents throughout its history; only one of them yielded fatalities. Hull-losses are listed below.

1 April 1979: A Boeing 707-320C, registration 5X-UAL, that was standing at Entebbe International Airport, was destroyed by forces of the Tanzanian Army during the Uganda–Tanzania War. No fatalities were reported.
17 October 1988: Flight 775 was an international scheduled London-Gatwick–Rome-Fiumicino–Entebbe passenger service that crashed because of poor visibility on the final stage of its first leg, during the approach phase to Leonardo da Vinci-Fiumicino Airport. The flight was operated with a Boeing 707-320C, tail number 5X-UBC. The aircraft broke up after hitting the roof of a building, and burst into flames. Out of 52 occupants aboard, there were 33 fatalities, while many survivors were seriously injured.

See also

Transport in Uganda

References

Bibliography

External links

Defunct airlines of Uganda
Airlines disestablished in 2001
Government-owned airlines
Airlines established in 1976
Economy of Uganda
1976 establishments in Uganda